José Ignacio González Catalán (born 2 December 1989), known as Ignacio González, is a Chilean footballer that currently plays for Deportes Antofagasta in the Chilean Primera División.

Honours

Club
Colo-Colo
 Primera División de Chile (2): 2008 Clausura, 2009 Clausura

Individual
 Torneo Futsal Best Goalkeeper (1): 2010

References

External links
 José Ignacio González at Football-Lineups
 
 

1989 births
Living people
Footballers from Santiago
Chilean footballers
Colo-Colo B footballers
Colo-Colo footballers
Puerto Montt footballers
Everton de Viña del Mar footballers
Deportes Copiapó footballers
San Luis de Quillota footballers
Club Deportivo Palestino footballers
C.D. Antofagasta footballers
Segunda División Profesional de Chile players
Primera B de Chile players
Chilean Primera División players
Association football goalkeepers